Paul Philip Jones (born 2 October 1976) is an English former professional footballer who played as a left-back. He made appearances in the English Football League with Wrexham, and in the Welsh League with Bangor City.

References

1976 births
Living people
English footballers
Association football defenders
Wrexham A.F.C. players
Bangor City F.C. players
English Football League players